The list of ship commissionings in 1995 includes a chronological list of all ships commissioned in 1995.


See also 

1995